The eighth edition of the bi-annual UNCAF Nations Cup was held in Guatemala, from February 19 to 27, 2005. All matches were played at the Estadio Mateo Flores in Guatemala City. The four semifinalists qualified for 2005 CONCACAF Gold Cup.

Squads
For a complete list of all participating squads see UNCAF Nations Cup 2005 squads

Venue

First round

Group A

Group B

Knockout stage

Semifinals

Third place match

Final

Awards

Goalscorers
6 goals

 Wilmer Velásquez

5 goals

 Milton Núñez

4 goals

 Juan Carlos Plata

3 goals

 Edwin Villatoro
 Whayne Wilson

2 goals

 Roy Myrie
 Hernán Sandoval

1 goal

 Erick Scott
 Géiner Segura
 Douglas Sequeira
 Dennis Alas
 Gonzalo Romero
 Milton Bustos
 Juan Vílchez
 Juan Ramón Solís

External links
 RSSSF Archive

 
2005 in Central American football

2005
2005
2004–05 in Salvadoran football
2004–05 in Costa Rican football
2004–05 in Honduran football
2004–05 in Guatemalan football
2004–05 in Nicaraguan football
2004–05 in Panamanian football
2004–05 in Belizean football